Provincial Trunk Highway 9A (PTH 9A) is a provincial primary highway located in the Canadian province of Manitoba. The route is an alternate route of PTH 9 through Selkirk, Manitoba for those that are travelling to and from or want to go through Selkirk itself, instead of taking the bypass.

Route description

PTH 9A begins in the Rural Municipality of St. Andrews in the hamlet of Old England at an intersection with PTH 9 (Main Street / Selkirk Bypass). The road heads northeast, paralleling the western banks of the Red River as a 4-lane divided highway to travel through the community before entering the city of Selkirk as it passes by a steel mill. It travels through neighborhoods and a business district before entering downtown, having an intersection with PR 204 (Eaton Avenue) before making a left onto 2-lane Manitoba Avenue, with Main Street continuing north as PR 320. PTH 9A leaves downtown and travels through more neighborhoods, where it makes a right onto Easton Drive, passing by a hospital as it enters a more rural area before coming to an end at an intersection between PTH 9 and PTH 4 (Selkirk Bypass), with the road continuing north as PTH 9 northbound.

Major intersections

References

External links 
Official Name and Location - Declaration of Provincial Trunk Highways Regulation - The Highways and Transportation Act - Provincial Government of Manitoba
Official Highway Map - Published and maintained by the Department of Infrastructure - Provincial Government of Manitoba (see Legend and Map#3)
Google Maps Search - Provincial Trunk Highway 9A

009A
Selkirk, Manitoba